Ibn Abī Zayd (922–996), fully Abū Muḥammad ʿAbd Allāh ibn Abī Zayd ʿAbd al-Raḥmān al-Nafzawī ibn Abī Zayd al-Qayrawanī, was a Maliki scholar from Kairouan in Tunisia and was also an active proponent of Ash'ari thought. His best known work is Al-Risala or the Epistle, an instructional book devoted to the education of young children. He was a member of the Nafzawah Berber tribe and lived in Kairouan. In addition, he served as the Imam (spiritual leader) of one of the mosques' that followed the Maliki School tradition. Based on what he wrote in his Risalah regarding creed, there was many alignments with the Ashari creed. Ibn Abi Zayd notably defended the ashari school in his epistle entitled “Al-Radd `ala al-Qadariyya wa Munaqada Risala al-Baghdadi al-Mu`tazili,” a refutation of the attacks of the Mu`tazili `Ali ibn Isma`il al-Baghdadi.

See also 
 Al-Risalah al-Fiqhiyyah

References

External links
islaam.org.uk "Ibn Abi Zayd al-Qairawani (d.386H)", by Hassan Ahmad, from al-Jumuah Magazine, Volume 12 Issue 9 (retrieved September 12, 2008)
Rahman, Sayeed, The Legal and Theological Thought of Ibn Abi Zayd al-Qayrawani (Yale University Ph.D., 2009) is the most comprehensive English language work on Ibn Abi Zayd

Asharis
Berber scholars
Tunisian Maliki scholars
10th-century jurists
10th-century Berber people
922 births
996 deaths
10th-century Muslim theologians
People from Kairouan